Kyle Hamilton Allen (born October 10, 1994) is an American actor known for his roles in The In Between, The Path, West Side Story, The Map of Tiny Perfect Things, and American Horror Story: Apocalypse.

Early life
A native of Livermore, California, Allen began training in acrobatics at a young age, and attended the Kirov Academy of Ballet in Washington D.C., where upon watching Taras Domitro perform Romeo & Juliet at the Kennedy Center, felt discouraged from pursuing ballet further. Upon graduation, he lived in Los Angeles picking up commercial work as well as a part lip syncing in a Master P music video.

Career
In July 2015, Allen was cast in a lead role on the Hulu drama series The Path co-starring Aaron Paul and Michelle Monaghan, appearing in all 36 episodes. Upon the series ending in 2018, Allen appeared in a recurring role in American Horror Story, and in 2019, he was cast as Balkan, one of the Jets in Steven Spielberg's West Side Story, an adaptation of the Broadway musical of the same name.

In 2021, Allen would be cast as Romeo in Rosaline, a modern retelling of Romeo & Juliet co-starring Kaitlyn Dever and Isabela Merced, and in The Greatest Beer Run Ever co-starring Zac Efron and Russell Crowe. On January 28, 2022, Allen was cast as He-Man in the Netflix live-action film reboot of Masters of the Universe. In October 2022, Allen was announced to star in A Haunting in Venice, the third instalment of Kenneth Branagh's Hercule Poirot adaptations.

Filmography

Film

Television

References

External links

1994 births
21st-century American male actors
21st-century American ballet dancers
People from Livermore, California
Living people
Male actors from California
American male film actors
American male television actors